John Varszegi is a Canadian script writer, director, film editor, cinematographer. He started his film related career as a freelance film critic and journalist. In the 90s he became a script writer at Dayka Theatre in Vancouver, British Columbia. In 2007 he founded HTVBC Film Studio in Victoria, British Columbia. He has made over 130 documentaries, short films, TV News and reports, music videos and several feature films. Besides of his numerous awards he was finalist at Reel International Film Festival 2018 (Perth, Australia), at "Detective FEST 2014" International Film and TV Festival (Moscow, Russia), four times at Cannes (France) International Short Film Festival, at Vancouver International Film Festival and was runner-up at many music video world contests.

Scriptography 
You Will Be My Husband - TV film (2018) Genre: romantic comedy
A Piece of Cake - stage play (2018) Genre: comedy
The Five Virtues - TV film (2017) Genre: mystery drama
The Wage of Captivity - TV film (2016) Genre: crime drama
Hunter - TV series (2015) Genre: action thriller
The 10 Dimensions Theory - feature film (2013) Genre: sci-fi action thriller
Steinway Grand - TV film (2012) Genre: comedy drama
Recess - stage play (1998) - Dayka Theatre, Vancouver, BC
My Wife, the Superstar - stage play (1998) - Dayka Theatre, Vancouver, BC
Who’s coming to us? - stage play (1997) - Dayka Theatre, Vancouver, BC
Man of Honour - stage play (1997) - Dayka Theatre, Vancouver, BC

Filmography 
You Will Be My Husband - TV film (2018) Genre: romantic comedy
A Piece of Cake - TV film (2018) Genre: comedy
I Am Hamlet - TV film (2018) Genre: comedy drama
The Five Virtues - TV film (2017) Genre: mystery drama
The Wage of Captivity - TV film (2016) Genre: crime drama
How My Parents Met - TV film (2016) Genre: crime comedy
Dangerous Theories - TV film (2016) Genre: action sci fi
Hunter - TV film (2015) Genre: action thriller
The Island of a Thousand Cultures - TV Series 12/12 (2013–14) Genre: documentary
Dimension Folders (work title: The 10 Dimension Theory) - feature film (2013) Genre: sci fi action thriller
Unsound Innocence - feature film (2012) Genre: psycho-thriller drama
Steinway Grand - TV film (2012) Genre: comedy drama
Decision Factor - feature film (2011) Genre: romantic comedy
The Sea of Music - short film (2011) Genre: music video
The Long Walk - short film (2011) Genre: drama
Runaround Sue - short film (2011) Genre: music video
Heads and Tales - short film (2011) Genre: romantic comedy
The Mayas - short film (2010) Genre: documentary
Whistler Winter Olympic Games - short film (2010) Genre: report film
Blind Date - short film (2010) Genre: romantic comedy
Heroes Among Us - short film (2010) Genre: documentary
Kilauea Volcano - short film (2010) Genre: documentary
20 Weeks - short film (2010) Genre: documentary
For Giving Me Meaning – short film (2010) Genre: romantic comedy
Macbeth - short film (2009) Genre: drama
You are vain - short film (2009) Genre: music video
Blue Planet - short film (2009) Genre: music video
Love Train - short film (2009) Genre: music video
European Moments - short film (2009) Genre: music video
Four Seasons - short film (2009) Genre: music video
Victoria My Love - short film (2009) Genre: music video
Tear the World Down - short film (2009) Genre: music video
Walk of Life (1-5) - short films (2008) Genre: report documentary
Chinese Dance - short film (2008) Genre: report documentary
Victoria Day - short film (2008) Genre: report documentary
AT&T - short film (2008) Genre: commercial
Logitech - short film (2008) Genre: commercial
Kodak - short film (2008) Genre: commercial
ING Direct - short film (2007) Genre: commercial
E-Insurance - short film (2007) Genre: commercial
Budweiser - short film (2007) Genre: commercial
Luster - short film (2007) Genre: commercial
Binaca - short film (2007) Genre: commercial
Panthene - short film (2007) Genre: commercial
Kushyfoot - short film (2007) Genre: commercial
Cocaine - short film (2006) Genre: comedy
Leave it to Uncle Willy (1-12) - short films (2006) Genre: comedy series
BC TV News (1-12) - short films (2006) Genre: TV News
Ice Fishing - short film (2006) Genre: documentary
Kelowna Wineries - short film (2006) Genre: documentary
Carnations - short film (2006) Genre: romantic comedy
Butchart Gardens - short film (2006) Genre: documentary
There is Still Hope - short film (2005) Genre: experimental
Mother - short film (2005) Genre: experimental
Fear Not - short film (2005) Genre: experimental
Modern Tales - short film (2005) Genre: experimental
Absurds - short film (2005) Genre: experimental
My Me - short film (2005) Genre: experimental

DVD Releases 
Hunter - feature, crime drama (2015)
Dimension Folders - feature, sci fi action (2013)
Unsound Innocence - feature, psycho drama (2013)
Steinway Grand - feature, comedy-drama (2013)
Decision Factor - feature, romantic comedy (2013)

TV Shows 
"I Am Hamlet" comedy drama was first aired Aug 20, 2018 18:00 on Canada TV Channel 4.

"A Piece of Cake" comedy was first aired July 9, 2018 20:00 on Canada TV Channel 4.

"The Five Virtues" mystery drama was first aired Sept 18, 2017 12:00 on Canada TV Channel 4.

"The Wage of Captivity" thriller drama was first aired Nov 22, 2016 23:00 on Canada TV Channel 4.

"How My Parents Met" crime comedy was first aired May 31, 2016 13:00 on Canada TV Channel 4.

"Dangerous Theories" action sci fi was first aired January, 2016 22:00 on Canada TV Channel 4.

"Hunter" crime drama was first aired Oct 20, 2015 23:00 on Canada TV Channel 4.

"The Island of a Thousand Cultures" TV series Episode 01/12 was first aired Sept 14, 2013 09:00 on Canada TV Channel 4.

"Steinway Grand" comedy drama was first aired July 21, 2013 19:00 on Canada TV Channel 4.

"The Long Walk" film drama was first aired July 5, 2013 23:45 on Canada TV Channel 4.

References 

https://www.imdb.com/name/nm4486592/

http://www.fest21.com/en/film/decision_factor

http://www.fest21.com/en/search/node/htvbc

https://www.amazon.com/dp/B015X21D78

https://www.amazon.com/dp/B00CWKWCPW

https://www.amazon.com/Unsound-Innocence-John-Varszegi/dp/B00DBE9350/ref=sr_1_1?s=movies-tv&ie=UTF8&qid=1371144589&sr=1-1&keywords=John+Varszegi

https://www.amazon.com/Steinway-Grand/dp/B00CWKW4L4/ref=sr_1_3?s=movies-tv&ie=UTF8&qid=1371144904&sr=1-3&keywords=Steinway+grand

https://www.amazon.com/Decision-Factor/dp/B00EYO1YEO/ref=sr_1_1?s=movies-tv&ie=UTF8&qid=1378279576&sr=1-1&keywords=Decision+Factor

https://www.youtube.com/channel/UCyqh_MWtoVz29AuYyedh4zQ

https://management6845.wixsite.com/website

External links 

HTVBC Film Studio official site

Canadian male screenwriters
Film directors from British Columbia
Canadian documentary film directors
Canadian cinematographers
Living people
Year of birth missing (living people)
21st-century Canadian screenwriters
21st-century Canadian male writers